Abu Dali, or Abudali can refer to the following places:
 Abu Dali, Hama, a village in the Hama Governorate, Syria
 Abu Dali, Homs, a village in the Homs Governorate, Syria
 Abu Dali, Idlib, a village in the Idlib Governorate, Syria